= Firefighting Weekly =

Chinese firefighting newspaper

- Founded: 7 January 1998
- Ceased publication: 28 December 2018
- Headquarters: Beijing
- Website: cpd.com.cn/epaper/xfzk/

The Firefighting Weekly or Xiaofang Zhoukan (Chinese: 消防周刊), whose full name was People's Public Security Post - Firefighting Weekly (人民公安报·消防周刊), was a Beijing-based Chinese-language firefighting newspaper published in China.

Firefighting Weekly was officially founded on 7 January 1998, and ceased publication on 28 December 2018.

== History and profile ==
The Firefighting Weekly was a sub-paper of People's Public Security Post, and was sponsored by People's Public Security Post Agency on 7 January 1998.

On 28 December 2018, Firefighting Weekly ceased publication.
